Gavin Shane DeGraw (born February 4, 1977) is an American singer-songwriter. DeGraw rose to fame with his song "I Don't Want to Be" from his debut album Chariot (2003); the song became the main theme song for The WB drama series One Tree Hill. Other notable singles from his debut album were "Chariot" and "Follow Through". 

His second album, Gavin DeGraw, was released in 2008 and included the top-20 single "In Love with a Girl". In 2009, DeGraw released his third album, Free. His fourth album, Sweeter (2011), spawned the hit single "Not Over You", along with "Soldier" and "Sweeter". In 2013, DeGraw released the album Make a Move, while in 2016 he released the album Something Worth Saving.
In 2022, he released Face the River and a documentary on how he made the record and how he dealt with his parents' death.

DeGraw's duet with Colbie Caillat on "We Both Know" for the 2013 film Safe Haven received a Grammy Award nomination.

Early life

Family and education
Born February 4, 1977, DeGraw grew up in South Fallsburg, New York. His mother, Lynne (née Krieger, 1951–2017), was a detox specialist nurse practitioner, and his father, Wayne DeGraw, was a prison guard; he referenced his father's and mother's respective occupations in the song "I Don't Want to Be". His father was of Irish descent and his mother was of Russian Jewish ancestry.

Musical approach
DeGraw began singing and playing piano at the age of eight. He has two older siblings: a sister, Neeka, and a brother, Joey (who is also a musician). Growing up in a musical family, he was raised to regard music as part of the fabric of everyday life rather than as a remote show-business ideal.

As a teenager, DeGraw experienced a personal epiphany when he discovered Ray Charles and Sam Cooke, whose combination of personal charm and emotional commitment struck a chord in the budding musician. DeGraw played in a local Catskills group called "The People's Band" with his brother Joey and with local musician and vocalist Steven Levine. The band played many of the local hotels and clubs around the Monticello area. On his brother's advice, DeGraw began writing his own songs. He attended Ithaca College on a music scholarship, but found himself spending more time in his dorm room writing songs than attending classes and dropped out after one semester. DeGraw then moved to Boston, where he attended the prestigious Berklee College of Music for two semesters while singing in a rock band and playing solo gigs on the side.

Music career
After leaving Berklee and relocating to Manhattan in March 1998, DeGraw laid the groundwork for a musical career. Within a few months of his arrival, DeGraw made his way into the Sunday night Ron Grant and Friends open-mike night at Wilson's (the noted Upper West Side restaurant inside the Lucerne hotel). The night manager, Shar Thompson, introduced DeGraw to the club's owner, Debbie Wilson, the next day. Wilson signed on as his manager. DeGraw began developing a reputation in New York's music community. DeGraw eventually signed a record deal with Clive Davis and his J Records imprint, the home of Santana as well as R&B singers Alicia Keys and Angie Stone.

In the spring of 2002, DeGraw began work on his debut album. "I wanted to create something that was timeless rather than fashionable", he explained. "I was concerned with developing a sound that wasn't disposable. I didn't want to have too much glitter on me". The adjustment from the live stage to the recording studio was an educational process that gave DeGraw new insight into his work. "It made me think about making records differently," he says. "At first I felt out of my element because you have to learn the language and the science of making a record. It's a real process to get to the point where it doesn't sound like it's a process. We worked at making it breathe". The album, entitled Chariot, was recorded at Sunset Sound in Los Angeles and produced by Mark Endert.

DeGraw rose to fame in 2003 when "I Don't Want to Be" was chosen as the theme song for teen drama One Tree Hill. Chariot was released on July 22, 2003 by J Records. It sold over a million copies and earned platinum certification. In addition to "I Don't Want to Be", the album featured the singles "Follow Through" and "Chariot"; each of the three singles was certified gold after selling more than a million copies. "I Don't Want to Be" peaked at number 10 in the U.S. charts and has been performed on American Idol and Idol Sweden by various contestants during different seasons. DeGraw went on to release an acoustic version of Chariot in 2004. Entitled Chariot Stripped, the album contained a cover version of Sam Cooke's "A Change Is Gonna Come".

DeGraw's 2006 single, "We Belong Together", was certified gold.

DeGraw's second studio album, the self-titled Gavin DeGraw, was released on May 6, 2008. Ahead of this, the single "In Love with a Girl" was released on February 12, 2008. The second U.S. single from the album, "Cheated On Me", was released in the U.S. on September 30, 2008. Gavin DeGraw debuted at No. 1 on the digital sales chart and ranked at No. 7 on Billboard's Top 200 album chart.

DeGraw's Live From Soho album, released on November 7, 2008, featured mostly tracks from Gavin DeGraw.

On March 31, 2009, DeGraw's third studio album, Free, was released. DeGraw made Free in less than two weeks at the Brooklyn studio of his producer, Camus Celli. DeGraw included some songs on the album that he wrote very early in his career and that have evolved over time, songs such as "Dancing Shoes" and "Glass". The debut single from the album, "Stay", was released on March 11, 2009. Free has been described as "recorded versions of his live favourites".

DeGraw's fourth album, Sweeter, was released on September 20, 2011. The album featured many tracks co-written with other artists. The album's first single, "Not Over You", was co-written and produced by Ryan Tedder and was said to have been inspired by Kyle Craig. "Not Over You" is his first song to reach the top spot on the Adult Pop Songs chart; the single has been certified platinum. Sweeter contains collaborations from producers including Butch Walker, Eric Rosse, and Ron Aniello; alongside another co-written title track, "Sweeter" with Andrew Frampton. The album was recorded in many locations including Blackbird Studios in Nashville, Walker's Space in Venice and the Henson Recording Studios. Sweeter is DeGraw's first album released under RCA Records; all three of his previous albums were released under J Records. DeGraw went on to release an acoustic album based mostly on songs from Sweeter. The iTunes Session album features seven tracks and a 30-minute interview.

DeGraw sang "Baby It's Cold Outside" with Colbie Caillat on her 2012 Christmas in the Sand album. The pair also wrote the song "We Both Know" for the soundtrack of the 2013 film Safe Haven. The duo received a Grammy Award nomination.

On June 18, 2013, DeGraw released "Best I Ever Had", the first single from his fifth studio album. The album, Make a Move, was released October 15, 2013. During that year, he supported Train across their series of US shows; The Script also appeared in several of those shows.

In 2014, DeGraw opened for Billy Joel. DeGraw then released his first greatest hits album Finest Hour: The Best of Gavin DeGraw on October 21, 2014. The album includes the new songs "You Got Me" (featured in the film Dolphin Tale 2) and "Fire" (released on August 12, 2014).

On September 9, 2016, DeGraw released his sixth studio album, Something Worth Saving.

On May 20, 2022, DeGraw's released his seventh studio album Face the River, with the title track serving as the lead single. August 27 is International Listen to Gavin DeGraw Day.

Other work

Acting
DeGraw appeared in an on-screen role in four One Tree Hill episodes. His first appearance was in 2004, during "You Gotta Go There to Come Back"; he was seen singing "I Don't Want to Be" at Karen's Cafe. His second appearance was in season 2 where he sang "Chariot" in episode 17. His third appearance was in the season five finale, "What Comes After the Blues", where he was seen singing "I Don't Want to Be" with Jamie Scott (Jackson Brundage). DeGraw appeared on the show a final time during the series' last episode, in which he sang "Belief", "Soldier" and "I Don't Want to Be" at TRIC's 10th Anniversary party.

Dancing
DeGraw was a contestant on season 14 of ABC's Dancing with the Stars, which premiered on March 19, 2012. DeGraw and his partner Karina Smirnoff were eliminated from the competition during week 5, following a Dance Duel with castmate Jaleel White and his partner, Kym Johnson.

The National Underground
DeGraw and his brother opened The National Underground in December 2007. The National Underground is a roots rock/Americana music bar located in Manhattan's Lower East Side. The venue offers music, food, and drink. The idea for the venue came about because the brothers wanted a place where they could hang out on a regular basis, and where other musicians could come in and listen and learn. "We were picky about the quality of musicians that played there", DeGraw says. "We wanted a place where the players were so good, other musicians were like, 'Wow! I really respect what they're doing.'"

Personal life
On August 8, 2011, DeGraw was hospitalized after being assaulted by several people in Manhattan's East Village after leaving The National Underground. Police reported that a group of men attacked DeGraw early Sunday morning at East 6th Street and First Avenue. He suffered a broken nose, a concussion, two black eyes, and lacerations to his face. Only minutes after the attack, DeGraw was struck by a taxi at 19th Street and First Avenue. DeGraw was taken to Manhattan's Bellevue Hospital Center by ambulance, and he had to cancel a scheduled August 9 performance at the Saratoga Performing Arts Center in Saratoga Springs. In January 2012, DeGraw reported that he had made a full recovery from his injuries.

In September 2017, DeGraw's mother, Lynne DeGraw, died of pancreatic cancer. On July 2, 2020, DeGraw's father, John Wayne DeGraw, died after a brief illness.

Band members
Current members
Gavin DeGraw – lead vocals, piano, keyboards, rhythm guitar, acoustic guitar (2003–present)
James Cruz – bass guitar (summer 2012–present; previously as well)
David Maemone – keyboards (spring 2014–present)
Mike Baker – drums, percussion, backing vocals (summer 2014–present)

Former members

Johnny "Tsunami" Andrews – lead guitar, backing vocals
Joey DeGraw – lead guitar, backing vocals
Brian Dennis – lead guitar, backing vocals
Landon Ashworth - drums
Sam Ingram – keyboards, backing vocals, hand claps, 2nd best friend
Coltin Hanson – backing vocals, percussion, best friend
Matt Flynn – drums
Jose Barrera – lead guitar, musical composition
Mike Pedicone – drums
Joey "Coach" Hanna – drums, backing vocals
Rodney Howard – drums, percussion, backing vocals (2004–2006, 2009–2011)
Wijnand "Whynot" Jansveld – bass guitar, backing vocals

Alvin Moody – bass guitar, backing vocals
Billy Norris – lead guitar, backing vocals, musical director (2009–November 2022)
Casey Twist – bass guitar, backing vocals
Tony Tino – bass guitar (2009–summer 2012)
Ben Mars – bass guitar (summer 2012)
Jimmy Wallace – keyboards, organ, acoustic guitar, backing vocals (2007–2008, 2011–summer 2013)
Eric Kinny – keyboards (summer 2013–spring 2014)
Ian O'Neill – drums, backing vocals (2011–summer 2014)
Travis McNabb – drums, percussion, backing vocals
Michael "Tiny" Lindsey - bass

Discography

Studio albums

EPs

Compilation albums
 2014: Finest Hour: The Best of Gavin DeGraw

Live albums
 2001: Gavin Live

Singles

Tours
Headlining
Gavin Degraw Live in Concert 
Chariot Stripped Tour 
Gavin Degraw in Concert 
Where It Began Tour 
Sweeter Tour 
Make a Move Tour 
An Acoustic Evening with Gavin DeGraw 
Raw Tour 

Co-headlining
One Tree Hill Concert Tour 
Howie & Gavin on the Road 
2009 Summer Tour 
David Cook & Gavin DeGraw in Concert 
Colbie Caillat and Gavin DeGraw in Concert 
2014 Summer Tour 
Gavin DeGraw & Andy Grammer: Live in Concert 
2018 Summer Tour 

Opening act
Chasing Daylight World Tour 
Songs About Jane Tour 
Everywhere For Everyone Tour 
Virgin College Mega Tour 
Bonez Tour 
Summer Tour 2005 
The Circle Tour 
2011 Summer Tour 
Mermaids of Alcatraz Tour 
Billy Joel in Concert 
Rock This Country Tour 
All the Feels Tour 
Summer Plays On Tour 
Full Circle Tour -Spring 2022 performing new album Face The River.

Awards and nominations

See also

List of Berklee College of Music alumni
List of Ithaca College alumni
List of people from New York
List of singer-songwriters

Notes

References

External links

 DeGraw official website
 

1977 births
21st-century American singers
American male singer-songwriters
American people of Irish descent
American people of Russian-Jewish descent
American rock guitarists
American male guitarists
American rock pianists
American male pianists
American rock singers
American rock songwriters
Berklee College of Music alumni
Ithaca College alumni
J Records artists
Jewish American musicians
Living people
Singer-songwriters from New York (state)
People from the Catskills
People from Fallsburg, New York
Jewish rock musicians
21st-century American guitarists
Guitarists from New York (state)
21st-century American pianists
21st-century American male singers
21st-century American Jews